Richard Henry Stuart (born January 6, 1964) is an American politician and attorney. A Republican, he was elected to the Senate of Virginia in November 2007. He currently represents the 28th district, made up of six counties and parts of two others in the Northern Neck, Middle Peninsula, and northern Piedmont, including part of the city of Fredericksburg.

Early life and education 
Stuart was born in Fredericksburg, Virginia. He earned a Bachelor of Arts from Virginia Wesleyan University and Juris Doctor from the University of Richmond School of Law. Stuart also studied international law at Emmanuel College, Cambridge.

Career 
Stuart has represented Virginia's 28th Senate district since 2008. He is the Chair of the Senate Committee on Agriculture, Conservation, and Natural Resources and also sits on the following Senate committees: Commerce and Labor; Courts of Justice; Finance; and Rules.

Education reform 

Stuart has advocated for allowing students to approve tuition increases at Virginia public colleges and universities. In 2019, he introduced a bill that would require students to vote on proposed tuition increases before the governing board is able to vote on them. Under the proposed legislation, a two-thirds majority of students would need to approve them.

Robert E. Lee speech 
In February 2018, Stuart gave a speech praising Robert E. Lee, resulting in Lieutenant Governor Justin Fairfax, who normally presides over the Virginia Senate, choosing to walk off the podium rather than preside over the Senate during the speech.

Personal life
In 2016 he bought a 1,400 acre riverfront conservation easement near the Potomac River known as Stuart Plantation, and moved there with his family. The property was the site of a former plantation that had been in his family for generations until it was sold during the Great Depression. He was surprised to discover that riprap along the river shore contained cemetery headstones. Research by Virginia historians discovered that the markers were from Columbian Harmony Cemetery, a historic African-American burial ground in Washington, D.C., that was established in 1859 by the first burial society for free Blacks. It was in active use until 1959, then dug up and relocated in 1960. Approximately 37,000 bodies were reburied at National Harmony Memorial Park in Maryland, but the headstones were sold as scrap, including use in riprap. A nonprofit organization was formed to reclaim the gravestones, and as many as possible will be given to National Harmony. Stuart said he will work to create a parklike memorial along the Potomac to recognize any headstones that cannot be reclaimed.

References

Sources
 (Constituent/campaign website)

External links

1964 births
Living people
Republican Party Virginia state senators
Virginia Wesleyan University alumni
University of Richmond School of Law alumni
Alumni of Emmanuel College, Cambridge
People from Westmoreland County, Virginia
Politicians from Fredericksburg, Virginia
21st-century American politicians